Shobhabazar Rajbari (Shobhabazar Royal Palace) is the palace of the Shobhabazar royal family located in the Indian city of Kolkata.

History
Maharaja Nabakrishna Deb (1733–97), founder of the Shobhabazar Rajbari (at 35), started life as a modest aristocrat  but soon amassed considerable wealth in his service to the British, in particular by his role in assisting to topple Siraj ud-Daulah. During his lifetime Raja Nabakrishna Deb built two houses. The building at 35 Raja Nabakrishna Street (known as Shobhabazar Rajbari or "Baag ola Bari - House with the lions"), on the northern side of the road, was the one first constructed by him, subsequently inherited by his adopted son from his elder brother Gopimohan and his descendants including his son Radhakanta Deb.

The house at 33 Raja Nabakrishna Street (known as Choto Rajbari) was built by him when a son was born to him later in life, and was left to his biological son Rajkrishna and his descendants. Presently Surotamo Krishna Deb, the tenth Generation of Maharaja Naba Krishna Deb is residing there.

Role in cultural and social life of Bengal
 Raja Nabakrishna Deb celebrated Durga Puja in 1757 on a grand scale after the British defeated Siraj-ud-Daulah at the battle of Plassey. Lord Clive and Warren Hastings were in the list of invitees.
 It was here that the first civic reception of Swami Vivekananda after his return from Chicago Parliament of Religions was organised in 1897 by Raja Binoy Deb Bahadur.

Features
Although originally a saat-mahala house the most intact of the remaining spaces is the courtyard with the thakurdalan. A saat khilan thakurdalan with multi-foliate arches supported on pairs of squared pilasters. Pairs of columns with plain shafts rise up between the arches to support the entablature above.

The main residence

A large central courtyard with the thakurdalan at the northern end. A paanch khilan takurdalan with multifoil arches supported on compound columns. the double storey wings on either side of the courtyard connect the thakurdalan with the naach ghar to the south. The roof of the naach ghar has fallen through and very little of the superstructure remains.

The Nat Mandap
A set of eight massive Tuscan columns support a wide projecting cornice at roof level. Two rows of multifoliate arches at the northern end provide access to the nabaratna temple at the rear.

Gallery

References

External links

See also
Nabakrishna Deb
Surotamo Krishna Deb
Shobhabazar
Umasashi

Palaces in Kolkata
Tourist attractions in Kolkata